{{DISPLAYTITLE:C11H13NO}}
The molecular formula C11H13NO (molar mass: 175.22 g/mol, exact mass: 175.099714 u) may refer to:

 5-APB
 6-APB (6-(2-aminopropyl)benzofuran)
 p-Dimethylaminocinnamaldehyde (DMACA)

Molecular formulas